Philosophy and Literature is an academic journal founded in 1977 by Denis Dutton. It explores the connections between literary and philosophical studies by presenting ideas on the aesthetics of literature, critical theory, and the philosophical interpretation of literature. The journal, which has been characterized as "culturally conservative", aims to challenge "the cant and pretensions of academic priesthoods by publishing an assortment of lively, wide-ranging essays, notes, and reviews that are written in clear, jargon-free prose". 

The journal is normally published twice a year, in April and October, by the Johns Hopkins University Press. Circulation is 823 and the average length of an issue is 224 pages. The current editor is Garry Hagberg of Bard College.

References

External links 
 
Philosophy and Literature at Project MUSE
Homepage of Denis Dutton, founder and long-time editor

Literary magazines published in the United States
Philosophy journals
Aesthetics journals
Publications established in 1977
Johns Hopkins University Press academic journals
Biannual journals
English-language journals